The men's team competition of the squash events at the 2011 Pan American Games will be held from October 18 to 20 at the Squash Complex in Guadalajara, Mexico. The defending Pan American Games champion is the team from Colombia (Javier Castilla, Miguel Rodríguez and Bernardo Samper).

Round robin
The round robin will be used as a qualification round. The twelve teams will be split into groups of three or four. The top two teams from each group will advance to the first round of playoffs.

Pool A

Pool B

Pool C

Playoffs

Quarterfinals

Semifinals

Final

References

Squash at the 2011 Pan American Games